"The Gipper" is the nickname of George Gipp (1895–1920), an American football player.

Gipper may also refer to:

People
 Ronald Reagan (1911–2004) nicknamed "The Gipper", President of the U.S.
 Gipper "El Animal" Nieto, Jr., member of Kumbia All Starz music group
 Gipper Finau, competitor on the golfing reality TV show The Big Break

Other uses
 Mr. Gipper, a fictional dolphin from the 1963 film Flipper
 Gipper, a fictional engine in Disney animation TaleSpin
 , nicknamed Gipper, a U.S. Navy aircraft carrier

See also

 GIP (disambiguation)
 Gipp, a surname